Nazar Mahalleh (also Romanized as Naz̧ar Maḩalleh) is a village in Chelevand Rural District, Lavandevil District, Astara County, Gilan Province, Iran. At the 2006 census, its population was 26, in 5 families.

Language 
Linguistic composition of the village.

References 

Populated places in Astara County

Azerbaijani settlements in Gilan Province

Talysh settlements in Gilan Province